Mary Jane Kelly ( – 9 November 1888), also known as Marie Jeanette Kelly, Fair Emma, Ginger, Dark Mary and Black Mary, is widely believed to have been the final victim of the notorious unidentified serial killer Jack the Ripper, who murdered at least five women in the Whitechapel and Spitalfields districts of London from late August to early November 1888. At the time of Kelly's death, she was approximately 25 years old, working as a prostitute and living in relative poverty.

Unlike the other four canonical Ripper victims—each of whom had been murdered outdoors and whose mutilations could have been committed within minutes—Kelly was murdered within the sparsely furnished single room she rented at 13 Miller's Court, affording her murderer an extensive period of time to eviscerate and mutilate her body. Kelly's body was by far the most extensively mutilated of the canonical victims, with her mutilations taking her murderer approximately two hours to perform.

Early life
Compared with the other four canonical Ripper victims, Mary Kelly's origins are obscure and undocumented, and much of this information is possibly embellished. Kelly may have fabricated many details of her early life as there is no corroborating documentary evidence, but there is no evidence to the contrary either. According to Joseph Barnett, the man she had most recently lived with prior to her murder, Kelly had told him she was born in Limerick, Ireland, in around 1863—although whether she referred to the city or the county is not known—and that her family moved to Wales when she was a child.

Kelly is known to have claimed to one acquaintance that her parents had disowned her, although she remained on close terms with her sister. She described her family to Barnett as moderately wealthy, and both he and a reported former landlady of Kelly's, Mrs Carthy, claimed that Kelly came from a family of "well-to-do people". Barnett reported that Kelly had informed him her father was named John Kelly and that he worked in an ironworks in either Caernarfonshire or Carmarthenshire. Barnett also recalled Kelly mentioning having seven brothers and at least one sister. One brother, named Henry, supposedly served in the 2nd Battalion Scots Guards. She once stated to a friend named Lizzie Albrook that a female family member was employed at the London theatrical stage. Her landlord, John McCarthy, also claimed that Kelly received infrequent correspondence from Ireland.

Carthy described Kelly as being "an excellent scholar and an artist of no mean degree". However, at the inquest into Kelly's murder, Barnett informed the coroner that in the months prior to her murder, she had often asked him to read newspaper reports of the Whitechapel murders to her, suggesting that she was illiterate.

Newspaper accounts dating from November 1888 claim Kelly was known as "Mary McCarthy", which may have been a mix up with either the surname of her landlord at the time of her death or the surname of a previous landlady with whom she had lived until about 1886.

Appearance
Kelly has been reported as being a blonde or redhead, although her nickname "Black Mary" may suggest she had dark hair. Her eyes were blue. To some, Kelly was known as "Fair Emma", although it is unknown whether this applied to her hair colour, her skin colour, her beauty, or other qualities. Some contemporary newspapers report she was nicknamed "Ginger" after her hair (though sources disagree even on this point, thus leaving a description of hair colour ranging from ash blonde to dark chestnut).

Contemporary reports estimated Kelly's height at 5 feet 7 inches (1.70 metres). Detective Walter Dew, in his autobiography, claimed to have known Kelly well by sight. He described her as "quite attractive" and "a pretty, buxom girl". According to Dew, she always wore a clean white apron but never a hat. Sir Melville Macnaghten of the Metropolitan Police Force (who never saw Kelly prior to her death) reported that she was known to have "considerable personal attractions" by the standards of the time. The Daily Telegraph of 10 November 1888 described her as "tall, slim, fair, of fresh complexion, and of attractive appearance".

Marriage
When Kelly was aged approximately 16 in about 1879, she reportedly married a coal miner named Davis or Davies, who was killed two or three years later in a mining explosion. Without any means of financial support, Kelly relocated to Cardiff, where she lived with a cousin. Although there are no contemporary records of Kelly's presence in Cardiff, it is at this stage in her life that Kelly is considered to have begun her career as a prostitute, possibly being introduced to this profession by her cousin. No South Wales Police records exist to indicate Kelly was arrested for prostitution.

Relocation to London
In 1884, Kelly apparently left Cardiff and relocated to London, where she briefly worked for a tobacconist in Chelsea before securing employment as a domestic servant while lodging in Crispin Street, Spitalfields. The following year, Kelly is believed to have relocated to the central London district of Fitzrovia.

Via her acquaintance with a young French woman whom Kelly had met in Knightsbridge, she found work in a high-class brothel in the more affluent West End of London. She became one of the brothel's most popular girls and spent her earnings on expensive clothing and hiring a carriage. Reportedly, Kelly was invited by a client named Francis Craig to France, but returned to England within approximately two weeks, having disliked her life there. However, by the time of her return to London, Kelly had adopted the French name "Marie Jeanette".

East End
In 1885, Kelly briefly resided with a Mrs Buki in lodgings located near the London Docks North Quay. In the brief period of time she lodged with Buki, the two are known to have visited the home of a French lady living in Knightsbridge to demand the return of a box of expensive dresses belonging to Kelly. This information suggests Kelly's descent into East End life was markedly rapid and may have been influenced by her efforts to avoid retribution from a procurer. It is also believed to be at this stage in her life when Kelly began drinking heavily.

After leaving Buki's residence, Kelly lodged with a Mrs Carthy in Breezer's Hill, Ratcliffe Highway. According to this landlady, Kelly lived at her residence between 1885 and 1886, and she had left her residence to live with a builder whom Mrs Carthy later stated believed would have married her. Gravitating toward the poorer areas of the East End, Kelly reportedly lived with a man named Morganstone near the Commercial Gas Works in Stepney and later with a mason's plasterer named Joseph Flemming.

Acquaintance with Joseph Barnett
By 1886, Kelly was residing at Cooley's Lodging House in Thrawl Street, Spitalfields. On 8 April 1887, she became acquainted with 28-year-old Joseph Barnett, whom she first encountered on Commercial Street. Barnett—who worked as a fish porter at Billingsgate Market—took Kelly for a drink before arranging to meet her the following day.

Relationship and lodgings
The two agreed to live together upon their second meeting on 9 April. Initially, Barnett and Kelly lodged in George Street, close to Commercial Street. They later took lodgings in Little Paternoster Row, but were soon evicted for non-payment of rent and drunk and disorderly conduct. They later took lodgings in Brick Lane, before relocating to Miller's Court, off Dorset Street, in either February or March 1888.

13 Miller's Court
In early 1888, Kelly and Barnett moved into 13 Miller's Court, a small, sparsely furnished single room at the back of 26 Dorset Street, Spitalfields. This room had once been the back parlour of 26 Dorset Street and was partitioned by a wooden wall. The weekly rent for this room was 4s 6d.

Number 13 Miller's Court was a single twelve-foot square room, with a bed, three tables and a chair. Above the fireplace hung a print of "The Fisherman's Widow", and a small tin bath was beneath the bed. Two irregularly sized windows faced the yard, in which the dustbin and water tap serving the property were located, and the door opened directly into the twenty-six-foot-long arched passageway which connected Miller's Court with Dorset Street. This door was illuminated at night by a gas lamp located almost directly opposite the door to the property.

Kelly had lost her door key, instead bolting and unbolting the door from outside by putting a hand through a broken window beside the door. A German neighbour, Julia Venturney, claimed Kelly had broken this window when drunk, and that a man's coat was frequently placed in this broken windowpane to both act as a curtain and prevent draught from entering the room.

According to Kelly's friend and neighbour, Lizzie Albrook, Kelly was "heartily sick" of the life she was leading by 1888 and wished to return to Ireland "where her people lived". Her landlord, John McCarthy, later recollected: "She was a very quiet woman when sober but noisy when in drink." When drunk, Kelly would often be heard singing Irish songs, although when intoxicated, she would often become quarrelsome and even abusive to those around her, which earned her the nickname "Dark Mary".

Barnett lost his employment as a fish porter in July 1888, reportedly due to committing theft. As a result, Kelly again resorted to prostitution. According to Barnett, she began to allow other prostitutes to sleep in their room on "cold, bitter nights" as she did not have the heart to refuse them shelter. Initially, Barnett was tolerant of this until he and Kelly quarrelled over her sharing the room with a prostitute he knew only as "Julia". Barnett subsequently left 13 Miller's Court on 30 October, more than a week before her death, taking lodgings at 24–25 New Street, Bishopsgate. Nonetheless, between 1 and 8 November, Barnett visited Kelly on an almost daily basis, occasionally giving her money.

8 November

Barnett visited Kelly for the last time between 7 and 8 p.m. on 8 November. He found her in the company of a friend of hers named Maria Harvey. Barnett did not stay at the property for long and apologised for having no money to give her. Both he and Harvey left Miller's Court at about the same time. Barnett returned to his lodging house, where he played cards with other residents until falling asleep at about 12:30 a.m. Shortly before Barnett left Miller's Court, Lizzie Albrook also visited Kelly. She later recollected that Kelly was sober, and one of the last things she had said to her was: "Whatever you do, don't you do wrong and turn out as I have." In the early evening, Kelly is known to have had one drink in the Ten Bells public house with a woman named Elizabeth Foster. Later that evening, Kelly was seen drinking with two acquaintances at the Horn of Plenty pub on Dorset Street.

Fellow Miller's Court resident and prostitute, 31-year-old Mary Ann Cox, who described herself as "a widow and unfortunate", reported seeing Kelly returning home drunk and in the company of a stout, ginger-haired man, aged approximately 36, at 11:45 p.m. This man was wearing a black felt bowler hat, had a thick moustache, blotches on his face, and was carrying a can of beer. Cox and Kelly wished each other goodnight, with Kelly adding, "I am going to have a song." Kelly then entered her room with the man, who closed the door as Cox returned to her own lodgings at 5 Miller's Court. Kelly was then heard singing the song "A Violet from Mother's Grave." She was still singing when Cox left her lodgings at midnight, and when she returned approximately one hour later, at 1 a.m. Elizabeth Prater resided in the room directly above Kelly. When she went to bed at 1:30 a.m., the singing had stopped.

9 November
Unemployed labourer George Hutchinson, who knew Kelly, reported the two had met at about 2 a.m. on 9 November on Flower and Dean Street and that Kelly asked him for a loan of sixpence. Hutchinson claimed to be broke, having spent his money in Romford the previous day. He later stated that as Kelly walked in the direction of Thrawl Street she was approached by a man of "Jewish appearance" and aged about 34 or 35. Hutchinson claimed he was suspicious of this man because, although Kelly seemed to know him, this individual's opulent appearance made him a suspicious character to be in the neighbourhood. The man had also made an obvious effort to disguise his features from Hutchinson by "[hiding] down his head with his hat over his eyes" as the two had passed him.

Hutchinson later provided the police with an extremely detailed description of the man right down to the colour of his eyelashes despite it being the early hours of the morning. He reported that he overheard them talking in the street opposite the court where Kelly was living; Kelly complained of losing her handkerchief, and the man gave her a red one of his own. Hutchinson claimed that he then heard Kelly state: "Alright my dear, come along. You will be comfortable." She and the man walked into 13 Miller's Court, and Hutchinson followed them. He saw neither one of them again, laying off his watch at about 2:45 a.m.

Hutchinson's statement appears to be partly corroborated by a laundress named Sarah Lewis, who reported that as she walked towards the courtyard at 2:30 a.m. to spend the night with her friends, the Keylers, who resided at 2 Miller's Court, she had observed two or three people standing near the Britannia pub, including a respectably dressed young man with a dark moustache talking with a woman. Both appeared to be drunk. A poorly dressed and hatless young woman also stood nearby. Opposite Miller's Court, Lewis observed a "stout-looking and not very tall" man standing at the entrance to the courtyard, observing the entranceway. As Lewis passed this man, she observed a man in the company of an obviously drunk woman further up the courtyard. Lewis was adamant as to the timing of these sightings as she recalled hearing the chiming of the Spitalfields Church clock.

Shortly after 1 a.m., Mary Ann Cox again left her room. She returned to her home at approximately 3 a.m. Cox reported hearing no sound and seeing no light from Kelly's room at this time, although she thought she heard someone leaving the residence at about 5:45 a.m.

Murder
Elizabeth Prater, who resided in the room directly above Kelly's and who had been awoken by her kitten walking over her neck, and Sarah Lewis, who had slept at number 2 Miller's Court on 8–9 November, both reported hearing a faint cry of "Murder!" between 3:30 a.m. and 4 a.m., but did not react because they reported that it was common to hear such cries in the East End. Lewis described this cry as "only one scream. I took no notice of it". She claimed not to have slept and to have heard people moving in and out of the court throughout the night. Prater did leave her room at approximately 5:30 a.m., to walk to the Ten Bells pub for a drink of rum. She saw nothing suspicious.

Discovery

On the morning of 9 November 1888, the day of the annual Lord Mayor's Day celebrations, Kelly's landlord, John McCarthy, sent his assistant, ex-soldier Thomas Bowyer, to collect the rent. Kelly was six weeks behind on her payments, owing 29 shillings. Shortly after 10:45 a.m., Bowyer knocked on her door but received no response. He then attempted to turn the handle, only to discover the door was locked. Bowyer then looked through the keyhole, but could not see anybody in the room. Pushing aside the clothing used to plug the broken windowpane and the muslin curtains which covered the windows, Bowyer peered inside the room—discovering Kelly's extensively mutilated corpse lying on the bed. She is believed to have died between three and nine hours before the discovery of her body.

Bowyer ran to report his discovery to McCarthy, who first verified his claims, then instructed Bowyer to inform the Commercial Street Police Station. Bowyer ran to the police station, stammering the words: "Another one. Jack the Ripper. Awful. [John] McCarthy sent me" to Inspector Walter Beck. Beck accompanied Bowyer to Miller's Court, and immediately requested the assistance of police surgeon George Bagster Phillips. He also gave orders preventing any individuals from entering or exiting the yard. Beck also arranged for news of the murder to be telegraphed to Scotland Yard, and requested the assistance of bloodhounds. The scene was attended by Superintendent Thomas Arnold and Inspector Edmund Reid from Whitechapel's H Division, as well as Frederick Abberline and Robert Anderson from Scotland Yard, who arrived at the crime scene between 11:30 a.m. and 1 p.m.

News of the discovery of another Ripper victim spread rapidly throughout the East End. Crowds estimated to number over 1,000 gathered at each end of Dorset Street, with many members of the public voicing their frustration and indignation at the news.

Arnold ordered the room broken into at 1:30 p.m. after the possibility of tracking the murderer from the room with bloodhounds was dismissed as impractical. A fire fierce enough to melt the solder between a kettle and its spout had burnt in the grate, apparently fuelled with women's clothing. Inspector Abberline thought Kelly's clothes were burnt by the murderer to provide light, as the room was otherwise only dimly lit by a single candle Kelly had purchased on 7 November.

After two official crime scene photographs had been taken, Kelly's body was taken from Miller's Court to the mortuary in Shoreditch, where her body was formally identified by Joseph Barnett, who was only able to recognise Kelly's body by "the ear and the eyes". John McCarthy also viewed the body at the mortuary and was also certain the deceased was Kelly.

Post-mortem
The mutilation of Kelly's corpse was by far the most extensive of any of the Whitechapel murders, likely because the murderer had more time to commit his atrocities in a private room, without fear of discovery over an extensive period of time, as opposed to in public areas. The autopsy of Kelly's body took two-and-a-half-hours to complete.

Thomas Bond and George Bagster Phillips examined the body. Phillips and Bond timed her death to about 12 hours before the examination. Phillips suggested that the extensive mutilations would have taken two hours to perform, and Bond noted that rigor mortis set in as they were examining the body, indicating that death occurred between 2 and 8 a.m. Bond's official documents pertaining to his examination of the decedent, the crime scene, and subsequent post-mortem state:

Phillips believed that Kelly had been killed by a slash to the throat and the mutilations performed afterward. He wrote:

Inquest
The official inquest into Kelly's death was opened at the Shoreditch Town Hall on Monday 12 November. This inquest was presided over by the coroner for North East Middlesex, Roderick Macdonald, MP. The jury were duly sworn before being taken by Inspector Abberline to both view Kelly's body at the mortuary adjoining Shoreditch Church and the crime scene in Miller's Court. After approximately one hour, the jurors reconvened at Shoreditch Town Hall to hear witness testimony.

Character testimony
The first witness to testify was Joseph Barnett, who testified he had lived with Kelly for "one year and eight months" before the two had separated following a quarrel on 30 October over her allowing "a woman of bad character" to stay in her room, whom Kelly had "took in out of compassion". Barnett explained that, despite this argument, he had remained on good terms with Kelly in the week following their separation, and that he had last seen her alive at approximately 7:45 p.m. on 8 November. On the final occasion he had seen Kelly, she had been "quite sober".

Discussing Kelly's background, Barnett related her Irish origins, her marriage at age 16 and subsequent relocation to Cardiff following the death of her husband. Barnett also emphasised his belief Kelly's cousin was the source of her leading a life of prostitution, stating: "She was following a bad life with her cousin, who, as I reckon, and as I often told her, was the cause of her downfall."

Following Barnett's testimony, Thomas Bowyer recounted his discovery of Kelly's body on 9 November. Bowyer stated he had first observed two pieces of flesh on the bedside table, then seen Kelly's extensively mutilated body. He had "at once went very quietly" to John McCarthy to inform him of his discovery. McCarthy had himself looked through the broken windowpane to verify Bowyer's discovery before the two had separately proceeded to the nearest police station to report their discovery.

Bowyer's testimony was then corroborated by McCarthy, who stated Bowyer had informed him: "Guv'nor, I knocked at the door, and could not make anyone answer. I looked through the window and saw a lot of blood." The two had reported their discovery to Inspector Reid at Commercial Street Police Station. McCarthy stated Kelly's rent was in arrears by 29 shillings. In discussing her character, McCarthy described Kelly as an "exceptionally quiet woman" when sober, but that "when in drink she had a lot more to say".

Mary Ann Cox also testified at the inquest. Cox testified she had known Kelly for eight or nine months, and that she had last seen her alive in Dorset Street at 11:45 p.m. on 8 November, "very much intoxicated". She had been wearing a red pelerine and a shabby skirt. Cox stated she had been in the company of a short, stout and shabbily dressed man who had a pot of ale in his hand. She had not heard any sound from Kelly's room when she had returned to her own room at 5 Miller's court at 3 a.m. The next witness to testify, Elizabeth Prater, stated she had heard a "suppressed cry" of "Oh! Murder!" at approximately 3:45 a.m., although she stated such cries were commonplace in and around Spitalfields. Also to testify were witnesses Caroline Maxwell and Sarah Lewis. Maxwell testified to having seen Kelly alive on the morning of 9 November; Lewis testified to having seen a stout man in a black wideawake hat standing in the courtyard in the early hours and to hearing a woman cry "Murder!" at "nearly four".

Medical testimony
Shortly after Lewis's testimony, Phillips testified as to his examination of the body at 13 Miller's Court. He said he arrived at the crime scene at 11:45 a.m., and examined the body at 1:30 p.m. Kelly was lying "two-thirds over, towards the edge of the bedstead" and Phillips was certain the murderer had moved her body to perform the eviscerations. The initial attack had taken place as Kelly had lain on the right side of the bed, and the cause of her death was the severance of her right carotid artery. This conclusion was supported by a large quantity of blood under the bedstead and the palliasse, pillow and sheet at the top of the bed being saturated with blood. Blood spatterings on the wall on the right side of the bed in line with Kelly's neck also supported this conclusion.

Phillips estimated Kelly's death occurred between 2 a.m. and 8 a.m. Her last meal consisted of fish and potatoes, which had partly passed into her intestines, indicating she had last eaten between 10 p.m. and 11 p.m on 8 November. The superficial cut to her right thumb might have been caused while attempting to defend herself. The blade used for the mutilations was at least six inches (15cm) long and one inch (25mm) wide.

Police testimony
Following further eyewitness and character testimony from Julia Venturney and Maria Harvey, Inspectors Beck and Abberline testified about their response and examination of the crime scene. Beck testified to the orders he had given for a police surgeon to attend the scene, his efforts to retrieve evidence, and his orders forbidding any members of the public from entering Miller's Court, or for residents to leave until all had been questioned. Abberline testified Superintendent Arnold had ordered the door of Kelly's room to be forced open with a pickaxe at 1:30 p.m. He also testified as to his examination of the room, adding his opinion the extensive amount of clothing in the fireplace had been burned by Kelly's murderer to provide sufficient light for him to mutilate her body, as the sole source of light in her room had been a single candle placed on top of a broken wine glass.

Conclusion
Abberline was the last of 12 witnesses to testify at the inquest, and the hearings were completed in a single day. At the close of the hearings, Macdonald instructed the jury whether they should adjourn to hear further testimony at a later date, or close the procedures. He said: "My own opinion is that it is very unnecessary for two courts to deal with these cases, and go through the same evidence, time after time, which only causes expense and trouble. If the coroner's jury can come to a decision as to the cause of death, then that is all that they have to do ... From what I learn, the police are content to take the future conduct of the case. It is for you to say whether you will close the inquiry today; if not, we shall adjourn for a week or fortnight, to hear the evidence that you may desire."

Following a short deliberation, the jury returned a unanimous verdict: "Wilful murder against some person or persons unknown."

Kelly's death certificate was issued on 17 November. This document records her name as "Marie Jeanette Kelly" and lists her age as "about 25 years".

Investigation
Police conducted extensive house-to-house enquiries and searches. The wife of a local lodging-house deputy, Caroline Maxwell, claimed to have seen Kelly alive at about 8:30 a.m. on the morning of her murder, although she admitted to having only met Kelly on one or two previous occasions; moreover, her description did not match that of those who knew Kelly more closely. Maurice Lewis, a tailor, reported seeing Kelly at about 10 o'clock that same morning in a pub. Both statements were dismissed by the police since they did not fit the officially estimated time of death; moreover, they could find no other eyewitnesses to confirm these reports. Maxwell may have either mistaken someone else for Kelly or confused the actual day she had seen her.

On 10 November, Bond wrote a report officially linking Kelly's murder with four previous ones to occur in and around Whitechapel—those of Mary Ann Nichols, Annie Chapman, Elizabeth Stride and Catherine Eddowes. Bond also provided an offender profile of the murderer, which suggested the perpetrator was a solitary, eccentric individual who was subject to periodic attacks of homicidal and erotic mania, and who had been in an extreme state of satyriasis as he performed the mutilations upon Kelly and the four previous victims. On the same day, the Commissioner of the Metropolitan Police, Sir Charles Warren, issued a pardon for "any accomplice, not being a person who contrived or actually committed the murder, who shall give such information and evidence as shall lead to the discovery and conviction of the person or persons who committed the murder [of Mary Jane Kelly]". Despite this offer, no-one was ever charged with any of the murders.

No murders with a similar modus operandi were committed for over six months, as a result of which the police investigation into the Ripper murders was gradually wound down and press interest declined. Kelly is generally considered to have been the Ripper's final victim, and it is assumed that the crimes ended because of the culprit's death, imprisonment, institutionalisation, or emigration.

Joseph Barnett
The detective in charge of the investigation, Frederick Abberline, questioned Kelly's former partner and roommate, Joseph Barnett, for four hours after her murder. His clothes were also examined for bloodstains, but he was released without charge. Abberline's investigation appears to have completely exonerated Barnett.

A century after the murder, authors Paul Harrison and Bruce Paley proposed Barnett killed Kelly in a fit of jealous rage, possibly because she had scorned him. Harrison and Paley also suggested that he committed the previous murders to scare Kelly off the streets and away from prostitution. Other authors suggest Barnett killed Kelly only and had extensively mutilated her body to make the crime resemble a Ripper murder. The state of undress of Kelly's body, and her folded clothes on a chair, have led to suggestions that she undressed herself before lying down on the bed, which would indicate that she was either killed by someone she knew or believed to be a client.

The door to Kelly's property was locked after her murder, indicating the murderer either had possession of the key or knew how to reach through the broken windowpane to lock and unlock the door. However, the perpetrator would likely have observed Kelly reaching through the windowpane to unlock the door prior to inviting him into the room.

Other acquaintances of Kelly's put forward as her murderer include her landlord John McCarthy and her former boyfriend Joseph Fleming.

George Hutchinson

George Hutchinson only provided his eyewitness information to Sgt Edward Badham on 12 November. Inspector Abberline described Hutchinson's statement as important to the investigation. Hutchinson unsuccessfully accompanied police around Whitechapel and Spitalfields in efforts to identify this man. Hutchinson's name does not appear again in the existing police records, and so it is not possible to say with certainty whether his evidence was ultimately dismissed, disproven, or corroborated.

In his memoirs, Walter Dew discounts Hutchinson on the basis that his sighting may have been on a different day, and not the morning of the murder. Robert Anderson, head of the CID, later claimed that the only witness who got a good look at the killer was a Jew who had observed a previous victim with her murderer. Hutchinson was not a Jew, and thus not that witness. Some modern scholars have suggested that Hutchinson was the Ripper himself, trying to confuse the police with a false description, but others suggest he may have just been an attention seeker who made up a story he hoped to sell to the press.

Other theories
A small minority of modern authors consider it possible that Kelly was not a victim of the same killer as the other canonical victims of Jack the Ripper. At an assumed age of 25, Kelly was considerably younger than the other canonical victims, all of whom were in their 40s. In addition, the mutilations inflicted on Kelly were far more extensive than those on other victims. However, Kelly was also the only victim killed in the privacy of a room instead of outdoors. Her murder was separated by five weeks from the previous killings, all of which had occurred within the span of a month.

Writer Mark Daniel proposed that Kelly's murderer was a religious maniac, who killed Kelly as part of a ritual sacrifice, and that the fire in the grate was not to provide light but was used to make a burnt offering. In 1939, author William Stewart proposed that Kelly was killed by a deranged midwife, dubbed "Jill the Ripper", whom Kelly had engaged to perform an abortion. According to Stewart, the murderer had burned her own clothes in the grate because they were bloodstained and had then made her escape wearing Kelly's clothes. This, he suggested, was why Caroline Maxwell had claimed to have seen Kelly the morning of her murder, and that Maxwell had actually seen the killer dressed in Kelly's clothes. However, the medical reports, which were not available when Stewart constructed his theory, make no mention of pregnancy, and the theory is entirely based on speculation.

In 2005, author Tony Williams claimed that Mary Kelly had been found on the 1881 census return for Brymbo, near Wrexham, Wales. This claim was made on the basis that living next door to the Kelly family was a bachelor named Jonathan Davies, who could have been the "Davies" or "Davis" whom Joseph Barnett claimed had married Kelly when she was approximately 16. This claim is almost certainly wrong because if Kelly's husband was indeed killed two or three years later, this Jonathan Davies could not have been him, as the 1891 census return indicates this individual was still alive and residing in Brymbo. In any case, hardly any of the details given by Barnett matched those of the family residing in Brymbo in 1881. Brymbo is in Denbighshire, not Carmarthen or Caernarfon, and the father's name was Hubert Kelly, not John. Allegations that the diaries of Sir John Williams, on which Tony Williams based his research and whom he claims was the Ripper, were altered casts further doubt upon this author's theories. In 2015, author Wynne Weston-Davies advanced the theory that Kelly's real identity was his own great aunt Elizabeth Davies, born in 1857 as the daughter of a Welsh quarryman.

Funeral
Mary Jane Kelly was buried at 2 p.m. Monday 19 November 1888. She was laid to rest in St Patrick's Roman Catholic Cemetery in Leytonstone in a service officiated by the Reverend Father Columban.

No family members could be located to attend her funeral, and both Joseph Barnett and her landlord, John McCarthy, were insistent her remains were interred in accordance with the rituals of her Church. The eight individuals within the two mourning coaches following Kelly's polished elm and oak coffin from Shoreditch Church to the cemetery where she was buried were Joseph Barnett, an individual representing John McCarthy, and six women who had known Kelly and who had testified at the inquest into her murder: Mary Ann Cox; Elizabeth Prater; Caroline Maxwell; Sarah Lewis; Julia Venturney; and Maria Harvey. Several thousand people gathered outside Shoreditch Church to observe the funeral procession. Kelly's obituary ran as follows:

The inscription upon Kelly's grave marker reads: "In loving memory of Marie Jeanette Kelly. None but the lonely hearts can know my sadness. Love lives forever."

Portrayals

Film
 A Study in Terror (1965). This film casts Edina Ronay as Mary Jane Kelly.
 Murder by Decree (1979). Directed by Bob Clark. This British-Canadian mystery thriller film casts Susan Clark as Mary Kelly.
 Love Lies Bleeding (1999). A drama film directed by William Tannen. Kelly is portrayed by Andrea Miltner.
 From Hell. (2001). Directed by the Hughes Brothers, the film casts Heather Graham as Mary Kelly.

Television
 Jack the Ripper (1988). A Thames Television film drama series starring Michael Caine. Mary Kelly is played by Lysette Anthony.
 The Real Jack the Ripper (2010). Directed by David Mortin, this series casts Yulia Petrauskas as Mary Kelly and was first broadcast on 31 August 2010.
 Jack the Ripper: The Definitive Story (2011). A two-hour documentary which references original police reports and eyewitness accounts pertaining to the Whitechapel Murderer. Kelly is portrayed by Lexie Lambert.

Drama
 Jack, the Last Victim (2005). This musical casts Amanda Almond as Mary Kelly.

See also
 Cold case
 List of serial killers before 1900
 Unsolved murders in the United Kingdom

Notes

References

Bibliography
 Begg, Paul (2003). Jack the Ripper: The Definitive History. London: Pearson Education. 
 Begg, Paul (2004). Jack the Ripper: The Facts. Barnes & Noble Books. 
 Bell, Neil R. A. (2016). Capturing Jack the Ripper: In the Boots of a Bobby in Victorian England. Stroud: Amberley Publishing. 
 Connell, Nicholas (2006). Walter Dew: The Man Who Caught Crippen. Stroud, Gloucestershire: The History Press. 
 Cook, Andrew (2009). Jack the Ripper. Stroud, Gloucestershire: Amberley Publishing. 
 Cullen, Tom (1965). Autumn of Terror. London: The Bodley Head. 
 Eddleston, John J. (2002). Jack the Ripper: An Encyclopedia. London: Metro Books. 
 Evans, Stewart P.; Rumbelow, Donald (2006). Jack the Ripper: Scotland Yard Investigates. Stroud, Gloucestershire: Sutton Publishing. 
 Evans, Stewart P.; Skinner, Keith (2000). The Ultimate Jack the Ripper Sourcebook: An Illustrated Encyclopedia. London: Constable and Robinson. 
 Evans, Stewart P.; Skinner, Keith (2001). Jack the Ripper: Letters from Hell. Stroud, Gloucestershire: Sutton Publishing. 
 Fido, Martin (1987). The Crimes, Detection and Death of Jack the Ripper, London: Weidenfeld and Nicolson, 
 Gordon, R. Michael (2000). Alias Jack the Ripper: Beyond the Usual Whitechapel Suspects. North Carolina: McFarland Publishing. 
 Harris, Melvin (1994). The True Face of Jack the Ripper. London: Michael O'Mara Books Ltd. 
 Holmes, Ronald M.; Holmes, Stephen T. (2002). Profiling Violent Crimes: An Investigative Tool. Thousand Oaks, California: Sage Publications, Inc. 
 Honeycombe, Gordon (1982). The Murders of the Black Museum: 1870–1970. London: Bloomsbury Books, 
 Lynch, Terry; Davies, David (2008). Jack the Ripper: The Whitechapel Murderer. Hertfordshire: Wordsworth Editions. 
 Marriott, Trevor (2005). Jack the Ripper: The 21st Century Investigation. London: John Blake. 
 Rumbelow, Donald (2004). The Complete Jack the Ripper: Fully Revised and Updated. London: Penguin Books. 
 Sugden, Philip (2002). The Complete History of Jack the Ripper. New York: Carroll & Graf Publishers. 
 Waddell, Bill (1993). The Black Museum: New Scotland Yard. London: Little, Brown and Company. 
 Whitehead, Mark; Rivett, Miriam (2006). Jack the Ripper. Harpenden, Hertfordshire: Pocket Essentials. 
 Whittington-Egan, Richard; Whittington-Egan, Molly (1992). The Murder Almanac. Glasgow: Neil Wilson Publishing. 
 Whittington-Egan, Richard (2013). Jack the Ripper: The Definitive Casebook. Stroud: Amberley Publishing. 
 Wilson, Colin; Odell, Robin (1987). Jack the Ripper: Summing Up and Verdict. London: Bantam Press.

Further reading
 Barry, John Brooks (1975). The Michaelmas Girls. London: Deutsch. 
 Begg, Paul (2014). Jack the Ripper: The Forgotten Victims. London: Yale University Press. 
 Scott, Christopher (2005). Will the Real Mary Kelly...?. London: Adlibbed Ltd. 
 Weston-Davies, Wynne (2015). The Real Mary Kelly: Jack the Ripper's Fifth Victim and the Identity of the Man that Killed Her. London: Blink Publishing.

External links
 
 18 November 1888 news article detailing the inquest into the murder of Mary Jane Kelly
 22 December 1888 Evening News article pertaining to the murder of Mary Jane Kelly
 2009 Daily Telegraph article detailing the victims of Jack the Ripper
 BBC News article pertaining to the murders committed by Jack the Ripper
 Casebook: Jack the Ripper
 The Whitechapel Murder Victims: Mary Jane Kelly at whitechapeljack.com

1860s births
1880s murders in London
1888 deaths
1888 murders in the United Kingdom
19th-century Irish women
Female murder victims
Irish female prostitutes
Irish people murdered abroad
Jack the Ripper victims
November 1888 events
People from County Limerick
People of the Victorian era